Montenegro is a country on the Adriatic coast of the Mediterranean Sea.

Montenegro or Monte Negro, meaning "black mountain" in many Romance languages, may also refer to:

Montenegro (country)
 Republic of Montenegro (1992–2006), a federal unit of the Federal Republic of Yugoslavia, and later Serbia and Montenegro
 Socialist Republic of Montenegro, a federal unit of the Socialist Federal Republic of Yugoslavia from 1943 to 1992
Province of Montenegro, administrative unit within the Kingdom of Serbs, Croats and Slovenes from 1918 to 1922
 Kingdom of Montenegro (1910–1918)
 Principality of Montenegro (1852–1910)
 Prince-Bishopric of Montenegro (1516-1852)

Other places

Brazil 
Montenegro, Rio Grande do Sul
Monte Negro, Rondônia

Colombia 
Montenegro, Quindío

Mexico 
Monte Negro, Oaxaca

Spain 
Montenegro, Granada, Andalusia
Montenegro de Cameros, Castile and León

Arts
Montenegro (book), a 1997 novel by Starling Lawrence
Montenegro (film), a 1981 Swedish film

People
Montenegro (surname)
Montenegro Lines, a Philippine shipping company

Other uses
Amaro Montenegro, an Italian liqueur

See also
 Montenegrin (disambiguation)
 Montenegrins (disambiguation)
 Montenero (disambiguation)
 Black Mountain (disambiguation)
 
 Černá Hora (disambiguation)
 Crna Gora (disambiguation)
 Mali i Zi (disambiguation)